Several special routes of U.S. Route 25 exist. In order from south to north they are as follows.

Existing

Statesboro bypass

U.S. Route 25 Bypass (US 25 Byp.), in complete concurrency with State Route 67 Bypass (SR 67 Byp.), is the western half of the divided four-lane bypass, west around Statesboro, Georgia also known as "Veterans Memorial Parkway." The eastern half is US 301 Byp., which is in concurrency with SR 73 Byp. The entire length of US 25 Byp. is part of the National Highway System, a system of routes determined to be the most important for the nation's economy, mobility, and defense.

Waynesboro bypass

U.S. Route 25 Bypass (US 25 Byp.), in complete concurrency with State Route 121 Bypass (SR 121 Byp.), is a divided four-lane bypass, east around Waynesboro, Georgia. Only the southernmost portion of US 25 Byp. is part of the National Highway System, a system of routes determined to be the most important for the nation's economy, mobility, and defense.

Augusta–North Augusta business loop

U.S. Route 25 Business (US 25 Bus.) is a  business route of US 25 that connects Augusta, Georgia with North Augusta, South Carolina. Its Georgia portion is part of Broad Street and 13th Street. Its entire South Carolina portion is part of Georgia Avenue. In South Carolina, it is concurrent with South Carolina Highway 125 Truck (SC 125 Truck).

US 25 Bus. begins at an interchange with US 1/US 25/US 78/US 278/SR 10/SR 121 (Gordon Highway) on the line between the Olde Town portion of the city of Augusta and downtown. Northbound traffic on US 25 Bus./SR 28 has to make a U-turn to access Gordon Highway. Here, the business route is concurrent with SR 28. The two highways travel to the west-northwest. The next intersection is with 5th Street, which leads to the Riverwalk Marina. At this intersection, SR 28 departs to the left, heading toward the Government Center and an intercity bus station. On the southeastern corner of this intersection is the former location of the Haunted Pillar. An intersection with 6th Street leads to the Augusta Museum of History, Riverwalk Augusta, and St. Paul's Church. In the middle of this intersection is a crossing of some railroad tracks of Norfolk Southern Railway. An intersection with 7th Street leads to the Woodrow Wilson Boyhood Home and the James Brown Arena. Between 7th and 8th streets, the highway passes the Augusta Confederate Monument, the Lamar Building (the tallest building in the city), and the Imperial Theatre. 8th Street leads to the Bell Auditorium. Between 8th Street and James Brown Boulevard, it passes the Augusta Commons Park, a James Brown statue, and the Richmond County Board of Education building. James Brown Boulevard leads to the Augusta–Richmond County Public Library, the Augusta Convention Center, and Riverwalk Augusta. An intersection with 10th Street leads to the Morris Museum of Art and Riverwalk Augusta. An intersection with 12th Street leads to the Museum of Black History and Springfield Village Park. At an intersection with SR 4 (13th Street), which leads to the Sacred Heart Cultural Center, Meadow Garden, and the Medical District, US 25 Bus. turns right, off of Broad Street and onto SR 4 (13th Street). US 25 Bus. and SR 4 travel to the north-northeast on 13th Street. They intersect Jones Street, which carries the eastern terminus of the eastbound lanes of SR 104. The next intersection is with Reynolds Street, with carries the eastern terminus of the westbound lanes of SR 104. US 25 Bus. and SR 4 encounter an entrance to the New Bartram Trail before beginning to travel over the Savannah River on the James U. Jackson Memorial Bridge. About in the center of this bridge, SR 4 and 13th Street end at the South Carolina state line, and US 25 Bus. continues to the north-northeast on Georgia Avenue.

Almost as soon as US 25 Bus. crosses the river, it travels over The River Golf Club. It then curves to the north-northwest. Just south of an intersection with the northern terminus of Center Street, it passes the City of North Augusta Municipal Building. Center Street leads to this building, Brick Pond Park, and the Riverfront. Just north of this intersection, the highway curves back to the north-northeast. Just north of Clifton Avenue, it passes Wade Hampton Veterans Park. The business route then intersects the eastern terminus of West Buena Vista Avenue, which leads to Riverview Park and Lions Field, and the northern terminus of South Carolina Highway 125 (SC 125; the western terminus of East Buena Vista Avenue), which leads to the public safety complex and community center. At this intersection, SC 125 Truck begins, concurrent with US 25 Bus. An intersection with Spring Grove Avenue leads to the living history park and North Augusta Elementary School. At an intersection with the eastern terminus of Jackson Avenue, the highway curves to the northeast. Just south of Forest Avenue, they pass a memorial for the Hamburg Riot. Just north of this intersection is Lookaway Hall. They then intersect SC 230 (Martintown Road). Here, SC 125 Truck leaves the business route. Just northeast of an intersection with the eastern terminus of Butler Avenue, US 25 Bus. begins to curve back to the north-northeast. On this curve, it passes Davenport Park. Just north of Observatory Avenue, it passes the studio and office facility of WRDW-TV. The highway then passes a United States Post Office. North of Five Notch Road, US 25 Bus. curves to the east and reaches its northern terminus, an intersection with US 25/SC 121 (Knox Avenue) and the western terminus of Chalet North Road.

The following portions of US 25 Bus. are part of the National Highway System, a system of routes determined to be the most important for the nation's economy, mobility, and defense:
The entire length of the SR 28 concurrency
From the southern end of the SR 4 concurrency to the northern terminus

North Augusta connector route

U.S. Route 25 Connector (US 25 Conn.) is a  connector route of US 25 that is completely unsigned. Its entire length is in the southwestern part of Aiken County. Nearly all of the highway is in the northern part of North Augusta, with a very brief portion within Belvedere. As its name implies, it serves to connect US 25/SC 121 with Interstate 520 (I-520).

The connector route begins at a dead end. It travels to the west-southwest and immediately has an interchange with I-520 (Palmetto Parkway). Just after this interchange, the highway begins a curve to the northwest and intersects the Palmetto Parkway Trail. A short distance later, it very briefly cuts across part of Belvedere and then meets its northern terminus, an intersection with US 25/SC 121 (Edgefield Road). This intersection is on the North Augusta–Belvedere line.

Edgefield truck route

U.S. Route 25 Truck (US 25 Truck) is a  bypass of Edgefield, South Carolina, along Bauskett Street (S-19-10). Signage in the area shows a business banner on top of US 25, which goes through downtown Edgefield; it is in fact mainline US 25. The truck route is on a secondary road; it may be considered as a viable bypass.

Greenwood business loop

U.S. Route 25 Business (US 25 Bus.) is a business route of US 25 in Greenwood and its western terminus of SC 34 along with US 178.

Ware Shoals business loop

U.S. Route 25 Business (US 25 Bus.) is a  business route of US 25 that is partially within the city limits of Ware Shoals. Most of the highway is within Greenwood County; the rest of it is in Laurens County. The highway also has a concurrency with South Carolina Highway 252 (SC 252)

Travelers Rest connector

U.S. Route 25 Connector (US 25 Conn.) is an unsigned  connector route in concurrency with US 276 Conn., along Poinsett Highway. It connects US 25 with US 276, in downtown Travelers Rest, South Carolina.

Hendersonville business loop

U.S. Route 25 Business (US 25 Bus) was established in 2003 when mainline US 25 was rerouted along I-26. Replacing a section of US 176, it traverses through East Flat Rock, downtown Hendersonville, and Mountain Home, North Carolina, before reconnecting with mainline US 25 near Fletcher.

Asheville alternate route

U.S. Route 25 Alternate (US 25A) was established in 1934 as a renumbering of NC 69; the routing has remained unchanged since. US 25A begins in Arden, North Carolina, at the junction of NC 280 and US 25; travels north to Asheville near the Biltmore Estate and junctions back at US 25.

Marshall business loop

U.S. Route 25 Business (US 25 Bus) was established in 1960 when mainline US 25 was rerouted along new routing north of Marshall, North Carolina. In complete concurrency with US 70 Bus, it originally traversed along Main Street and Tillery Branch Road; in 1981, it was routed and extended further east along Ivy River Road.

Richmond business loop

U.S. Route 25 Business (US 25 Bus.) is a  business loop located in Richmond, Kentucky. It runs along the original alignment of US 25 through downtown Richmond, while US 25 proper bypasses the city to the east. US 25 Bus. is signed concurrently with U.S. Route 421 Business (US 421 Bus.) for its entire length, as U.S. Route 421 also runs concurrent with US 25 through the Richmond area.

Dry Ridge business loop

U.S. Route 25 Business (US 25 Bus.) is a  business loop located in Dry Ridge, Kentucky. It runs along the original alignment of US 25 through downtown Dry Ridge, while US 25 proper bypasses to the east of Dry Ridge.

Former

Greenville business loop

U.S. Route 25 Business (US 25 Bus) was established in 1968 or 1969 when US 25 was rerouted to bypass west of downtown Greenville.  US 25 Bus traveled along Augusta Road, Main Street, College Street, Buncombe Street, Rutherford Street, and Poinsett Highway; in 1975, it was rerouted onto Academy Street, removing it along Main Street.  In 1995, it was decommissioned; Over half of the route was already overlapped with a U.S. Route, while SC 20 and SC 291 were extended on parts of the former highway, leaving only a section of Augusta Road downgraded to secondary roads.

Hendersonville alternate route

U.S. Route 25 Alternate (US 25A) was a  alternate route in downtown Hendersonville, North Carolina, via Church Street, while mainline US 25 was on Main Street. In the early 1960s it was renumbered as southbound US 25, with Main Street becoming northbound.

Lexington business loop

References

External links

NCRoads.com: U.S. 25-A
NCRoads.com: U.S. 25 Business
Mapmikey's South Carolina Highways Page: US 25

25
25
25
25
25
U.S. Route 25